The Plague Within is the fourteenth studio album by British gothic metal band Paradise Lost. It was released on 1 June 2015 in Europe and 2 June 2015 in North America via Century Media Records. This album shows the band returning to their death-doom roots, mixed with elements of the gothic metal sound they are most known for.

Track listing

Personnel

Paradise Lost
Nick Holmes – vocals
Greg Mackintosh – lead guitar
Aaron Aedy – rhythm guitar
Steve Edmondson – bass
Adrian Erlandsson – drums

Production
Jaime Gomez Arellano – production

Charts

References

2015 albums
Paradise Lost (band) albums
Century Media Records albums